The Mission House is in Kerikeri, New Zealand.

Mission House may also refer to:

United States

 First Mission House, Bethel, Alaska
 Old Mission House, Fort Yukon, Alaska
 Mission Houses Museum, Honolulu, Hawaii
 Mission House (Stockbridge, Massachusetts)
 Mission House (Mackinac Island), Michigan
 Church Missions House, New York City

Other countries
 Bodden Town Mission House, Grand Cayman
 Hermannsburg Mission House, Hermannsburg, KwaZulu-Natal, South Africa
 Moravian Brethren Mission House, Nuuk, Greenland

See also
 Mission (station)